The AlphaTauri AT04 is a Formula One car constructed by Scuderia AlphaTauri for the 2023 Formula One World Championship. The car is driven by Nyck de Vries and Yuki Tsunoda. The AT04 is the fourth chassis built and designed by AlphaTauri and was unveiled on 11 February 2023 in New York City. The car also marked the return of Honda as a named engine supplier to Red Bull Racing and AlphaTauri, with both teams' engines badged as Honda RBPT.

Complete Formula One results
(key)

Notes
* Season still in progress.

References

2023 Formula One season cars
AT04